Cha Seo-won, born Lee Chang-yeop on April 15, 1991, is a South Korean actor. His breakthrough role was in The Second Husband (2022) where he won his first award as an actor. He is a cast member of the variety show I Live Alone since 2022.

Personal life 
Cha enlisted for his mandatory military service as an active duty soldier on November 22, 2022. In December 2022, it was confirmed that Cha suffered a minor injury to his finger at the training center. But there is no hindrance to activities and return his training normally after receiving treatment.

Filmography

Film

Television series

Web series

Television show

Theater

Discography

Singles

Ambassadorship 
 Korea Red Cross blood donation ambassador (2022)

Awards and nominations

References

External links
 

1991 births
Living people
South Korean male television actors
South Korean male film actors
Korea National University of Arts alumni